Evan Boehm (born August 19, 1993) is a former American football center. He played college football at Missouri.

Early years
At Missouri, Boehm was teammates with Markus Golden and both served as team captains for the Tigers. As a Junior in high school in 2010, Boehm was centerpiece on the Lee's Summit West High School team that won the Missouri Class 5 State Championship. As a senior in 2011, Boehm won the Thomas A. Simone Award, which is given to the most outstanding high school football player in the Kansas City Metro Area. Boehm's father, Royce, was his high school head football coach.

College career
Boehm earned a verbal scholarship from Missouri when he was in eighth grade, before he even started high school. As a starter all four years at Missouri, he set a school record with 52 consecutive starts. As a freshman, he started 12 games at left guard before starting 40 consecutive games at center in his final three years after switching positions prior to his sophomore year.

Professional career

Arizona Cardinals
Boehm was drafted by the Arizona Cardinals in the fourth round, 128th overall, in the 2016 NFL Draft.

Boehm entered the 2017 season as the Cardinals starting right guard. He started the first five games before losing the starting job to Earl Watford. He then started the final three games at right guard in place of the injured Watford.

On September 2, 2018, Boehm was waived by the Cardinals.

Los Angeles Rams
On September 4, 2018, Boehm was signed to the Los Angeles Rams' practice squad.

Indianapolis Colts
On October 8, 2018, Boehm was signed by the Indianapolis Colts off the Rams' practice squad. He played in 11 games, starting four at center in place of an injured Ryan Kelly.

Miami Dolphins
On August 30, 2019, Boehm was traded to the Miami Dolphins along with a 2020 7th draft pick for a 2020 6th draft pick.

Buffalo Bills
Boehm signed with the Buffalo Bills on April 16, 2020. He was released on September 5, 2020, and signed to the practice squad the next day. He was placed on the practice squad/injured list on September 23. He was released on October 12, 2020.

Jacksonville Jaguars
On November 2, 2020, Boehm was signed to the Jacksonville Jaguars' practice squad. He was released on December 14, and re-signed to the practice squad the next day. His practice squad contract with the team expired after the season on January 11, 2021.

Detroit Lions
On August 2, 2021, Boehm signed with the Detroit Lions. He was placed on injured reserve on August 16, 2021. He was released on August 23, 2021.

Miami Dolphins (second stint)
On November 9, 2021, Boehm was signed to Miami Dolphins practice squad. He was released on November 29.

New York Giants
On December 16, 2021, the New York Giants signed Boehm to their practice squad. On December 27, 2021, Boehm was released.

References

External links
 Missouri Tigers bio

1993 births
Living people
American football centers
Arizona Cardinals players
Buffalo Bills players
Detroit Lions players
Indianapolis Colts players
Jacksonville Jaguars players
Los Angeles Rams players
Miami Dolphins players
Missouri Tigers football players
New York Giants players
People from Lee's Summit, Missouri
Players of American football from Missouri
Sportspeople from the Kansas City metropolitan area